Sharmila Biswas is a noted Indian classical dancer and choreographer in the Odissi, and a disciple of guru Kelucharan Mohapatra. In 1995, she established Odissi Vision and Movement Center in Kolkata, where she is the  Artistic Director, the centre also has OVM Repertory.

In 2012, Biswas was awarded Sangeet Natak Akademi Award, conferred by the Sangeet Natak Akademi, India's National Academy for Music, Dance and Drama.

Early life and education
Biswas was born and brought up in Kolkata, where she started learning dance from the age of eight. When she was sixteen years old, she started training in Odissi under Muralidharan Majhi, and then trained under Kelucharan Mohapatra.

Subsequently, she learnt abhinaya from Kalanidhi Narayanan.

Personal life
Sharmila married Swapan Kumar Biswas in 1987, who is a doctor specialising in health management. The couple lives in Kolkata and have a  son Shoumik Biswas.

Career
Over the years, Biswas participated in performing arts festivals at Elephanta, Khajuraho Dance Festival and Konark Dance Festival and in UK, the USA, Germany, Russia, Dubai and Bangladesh. She performs both classical Odissi as well as her experimental choreographic works.

She has also done extensive research on the ancient Mahari dance performed by temple dancers of Orissa. In 1995, she established Odissi Vision and Movement Center (OVM) in Kolkata, where is the Artistic Director, and trains young dancer, the institute also run the OVM Repertory.

In 2009, she started Poorva Dhara, an annual festival of traditional dances of East and North East India.

Awards
She was conferred the "Best Choreography Award" from the Ministry of Information and Broadcasting, Govt. of India, for her dance production, Sampurna based on the devdasis of Puri. In 1998, Uday Shankar Award for Best Choreography in 1998 from the Department of Information and Broadcasting, Government of West Bengal. In 2010, Biswas was conferred the Mahari Awards. In 2012, she was awarded the Sangeet Natak Akademi Award, the highest award for performing artists, conferred by the Sangeet Natak Akademi, India's National Academy for Music, Dance and Drama.

See also 
 Dona Ganguly
 Srinwanti Chakrabarti

References

External links
 

Living people
Odissi exponents
Artists from Kolkata
Performers of Indian classical dance
Indian classical choreographers
Teachers of Indian classical dance
Recipients of the Sangeet Natak Akademi Award
Indian women choreographers
Indian choreographers
Women educators from West Bengal
Educators from West Bengal
20th-century Indian educators
Dancers from West Bengal
20th-century Indian dancers
20th-century Indian women artists
Year of birth missing (living people)
Women artists from West Bengal
Indian female classical dancers
20th-century women educators